Anne Doat (born 16 September 1936 Neuilly-sur-Seine) is a French actress.

Life 
She is the daughter of Jan Doat.

She studied at the Saint-Cloud high school but interrupted them to take drama classes with Jean Valcourt. She won a prize at the Léopold Bellan Drama and Declamation Competition.

This role earned her the Prix Suzanne-Bianchetti.

In 1956, she appeared, in the film Marie-Antoinette, queen of France, of Jean Delannoy, where she played Rosalie, the devoted servant of the Queen.

In the 1960s, she appeared in many dramas and television soap operas.

In 1963, she married director Jean Vautrin.

In 1970, she appeared in her last film, Teresa, by Gérard Vergez, based on the play by Natalia Ginzburg. In 1978, she appeared in her last role on television,  by Michel Mitrani. She acted in about twenty films, and plays.

In 1977, Anne Doat stopped her acting career after the birth of an autistic son. She devoted herself to her three children, and founded Autisme solidarité. 

Since the death of Jean Vautrin in 2015, she has worked to promote his work, gives readings, and donated the Jean Vautrin fund to the Gradignan media library, which participates in the project to digitize these archive documents.

References

External links 

 

1936 births
French actors